{{Infobox television
| alt_name           = Paranormal Witness: True Terror (2015–2016)| image              = ParanormalWitness.png
| caption            = Series title card
| genre              = 
| picture_format     =
| creator            = 
| composer           = Joel BeckermanTy Unwin
| starring           = 
| narrated           = 
| country            = United States
| language           = English
| runtime            = 60 minutes (inc. adverts)
| executive_producer = Bart LaytonDimitri Doganis
| producer           = Mark LewisSimon MillsAmy Lee-Jones (story)Sarah Zammit (assoc.)Kate Harrison (Can.)Steffan Boje (field)
| cinematography     = Joel DevlinGary ClarkeWill Pugh
| editor             = Julian HartBjorn JohnsonIain Kitching
| distributor        = NBCUniversal Television Distribution
| company            = Realand Productions, LLCRaw TV
| network            = Syfy (United States)Really / Watch / Pick (United Kingdom)
| first_aired        = Original series – Revived series| last_aired         = 
| num_seasons        = 5
| num_episodes       = 64
| list_episodes      = #Episodes
| preceded_by        = 
| followed_by        = 
}}Paranormal Witness''' is an American  paranormal documentary television series made by a British production company which described itself as "true tales of supernatural hauntings and explanation-defying paranormal experiences, which are brought to life through recreations". The series premiered on September 7, 2011, on Syfy in the U.S. It is also shown in the UK on Really, W, and Pick.

Ranked as one of the top 10 new original series, it was renewed for a 12-episode second season which premiered on August 8, 2012. Based on the high ratings of the first three episodes of season two, Paranormal Witness was renewed for a 20-episode third season which premiered on June 5, 2013.

Although Syfy did not announce the series' renewal following its third-season finale, it was reported that a fourth season had begun filming. On October 29, 2014, the series was officially renewed for a 13-episode fourth season, which premiered on August 26, 2015, under the new title Paranormal Witness: True Terror''.

On November 18, 2015, Syfy renewed the series for a 13-episode fifth season, which premiered on August 3, 2016.

Reception
While Deseret News writer Mark Rappleye characterized the show as "full of mind-numbing creepiness", he said that the show "will likely appeal more to believers and less to the even mildly skeptical". According to Rappleye, "Paranormal Witness” simply tells the story, insinuating that everyone should simply believe it as having actually occurred the way it is presented. This leaves little, if any, room for intellectual challenge or edification". New York Times reviewer Neil Genzlinger criticized the show, saying, "It doesn't bother hunting for hard evidence; it simply uses first-person testimony and re-enactment to sell the idea that someone has had a psychic encounter". Reviewing the show's "Long Island Terror" episode, science writer Sharon A. Hill said, "Paranormal Witness, is not what I would consider a fair documentation. It is not wise to take TV shows at face value. People put forth their story as they perceive it but it may not be how others perceive it or how it actually occurred. Saying there is a demon and Satanic activity associated with the house is a steep claim. Evidence is suggested but without verification we can't go anywhere with this story".

Series overview

Episodes

Season 1 (2011)

Season 2 (2012)

Season 3 (2013)

Season 4 (2015)

Season 5 (2016)

References

External links
 Official website
 
 

Alien abduction in television
Demons in television
Television series about ghosts
Television about werewolves
Witchcraft in television
Paranormal reality television series
2010s American documentary television series
2011 American television series debuts
2016 American television series endings
2010s American reality television series
English-language television shows
Syfy original programming
UFO-related television